Mohamed Belbachir (born 11 January 1994) is an Algerian middle-distance runner specialising in the 800 metres. He won the silver medal at the 2017 Summer Universiade.

International competitions

Personal bests

Outdoor
400 metres – 47.20 (Algiers 2016)
600 metres – 1:16.74 (Biskra 2015)
800 metres – 1:45.36 (Conegliano,Italy June, 2021)

References

1994 births
Living people
Algerian male middle-distance runners
Athletes (track and field) at the 2018 Mediterranean Games
Mediterranean Games bronze medalists for Algeria
Mediterranean Games medalists in athletics
Universiade silver medalists for Algeria
Universiade medalists in athletics (track and field)
Medalists at the 2017 Summer Universiade
Medalists at the 2019 Summer Universiade
Athletes (track and field) at the 2019 African Games
Universiade gold medalists in athletics (track and field)
African Games competitors for Algeria
Islamic Solidarity Games competitors for Algeria
21st-century Algerian people